Agdistis intermedia is a moth of the family Pterophoridae. It is found from  Hungary and Romania east to Russia and Kazakhstan.

Its wingspan measures 24–30 mm. Adults are on wing from June to August.

The larvae feed on Limonium vulgare.

Original description
As Adactyla benneti var. intermedia, in

References

External links

 Lepiforum e. V.

Agdistinae
Moths of Europe
Moths described in 1920